The 1888 United States presidential election in West Virginia took place on November 6, 1888, as part of the 1888 United States presidential election. West Virginia voters chose six representatives, or electors, to the Electoral College, who voted for president and vice president.

 West Virginia was won by the incumbent President Grover Cleveland (D–New York), running with the former Senator and Chief Justice of the Supreme Court of Ohio Allen G. Thurman, with 49.35 percent of the popular vote, against former Senator Benjamin Harrison (R-Indiana), running with Levi P. Morton, the 31st governor of New York, with 49.03 percent of the vote. Cleveland's razor-thin 0.32 percentage point margin of victory in the Mountain State remains West Virginia's closest presidential election result in history.

The Union Labor Party chose Alson Streeter, a former Illinois state representative, and Charles E. Cunningham as their presidential and vice-presidential candidates and received 0.95 percent of the vote. The Prohibition Party ran brigadier general Clinton B. Fisk and John A. Brooks and received 0.68 percent of the vote.

Results

Results by county

References 

West Virginia
1888
1888 West Virginia elections